Don Marziano Lavarello (17 March 1921 – 7 October 1992), commonly self-styled as Emperor Marziano II Lavarello Lascaris Paleologo  or Marziano II Lavarello Obrenovic, was an Italian eccentric, forger and pretender. Claiming to be the head of the Laskaris dynasty, which had ruled the Byzantine Empire in Nicaea from 1204 to 1261, and also claiming relations to the empire's last ruling dynasty, the Palaiologoi, Lavarello claimed to be the rightful Emperor of Constantinople. Through supposed connections to the Obrenović dynasty, previous rulers of Serbia, Lavarello also claimed to be the rightful King of Serbia.

Perhaps spurred by the questionable legitimacy of his own birth and the sense of inferiority experienced during a brief period as a refugee in the Vatican together with actual nobility during World War II, Lavarello pursued creating false genealogies for himself in order to enhance his lineage and consequently his social status. Lavarello continued to work on his genealogy throughout his life. A 1973 version made him out to be a descendant of the Greek god Zeus.

In the 1950s, Lavarello feuded with the Neapolitan comedian and actor Totò, who also claimed Byzantine connections. Lavarello lost this battle and was forbidden from using the surname "Lascaris" improperly. Despite this, he continued to maintain his claims until his death. Lavarello even organized an elaborate coronation ceremony, being crowned in a church in Rome on 18 November 1956. Throughout his career as "emperor", Lavarello was repeatedly faced with legal issues, homophobia and ridicule, but he also managed to secure a group of supporters, which eventually included actual nobility. Despite claiming to be the rightful head of the Orthodox Church, and claiming to outrank the pope, Lavarello was also interested in the occult and he and his supporters are recorded to have held several séances at his residence.

Biography

Parentage and early life 
Marziano Lavarello was born in Rome on 17 March 1921. He was the son of Olga Cassanello, and supposedly also the Genoese shipowner Prospero Lavarello. Olga had been legally separated from Prospero since at least 1904, seventeen years before Marziano's birth, and it is not clear if Prospero was still alive in 1921. Through some means, Olga managed to have Marziano registered under the name Lavarello, perhaps because divorce did not formally exist in Italy at the time and it was legal for a baby to adopt the surname of their mother's husband even if their parents were legally separated. Several critics of Lavarello would later accuse him of falsifying his baptismal certificate in order to hide his possibly illegitimate birth.

The Lavarello family was a distinguished Genoese family that could trace their descent back to the 14th century, but not to Byzantine nobility. Possibly on account of his mother having had an affair with a high-ranking member of the Catholic Church in Rome, Lavarello grew up in the Vatican instead of in Genoa. Throughout his life, Lavarello, in addition to his pretensions, attempted to pursue a career in painting, though he failed to gain any significant traction. He often looked for prestigious lines of descent, beyond his own Lavarello line, in order to enhance is social status. Lavarello's genealogical inventions were spurred not only be the questionable legitimacy of his own birth, but also by his experience during World War II. Because he was a student, Lavarello avoided being drafted into combat. Foreseeing the dangers posed to him by the threat of Nazi occupation, Lavarello returned to the Vatican as a refugee together with his mother in 1943. Given that there were many among the Italian nobility, critical to the fascist regime, already taking refuge in the Vatican, Lavarello's own lack of aristocratic titles spurred his inferiority complex. Lavarello only stayed in the Vatican for a few months, being expelled for "annoying" a young and handsome Swiss guard. After the liberation of Rome in June 1944, Lavarello began to refer to himself as a "marquis of Bourbon-Neapolitan origin".

Lavarello began an escalation of claimed prestige shortly thereafter by adopting the style "prince of Tourgoville" and the surname "Lascaris", claiming to be the head of the Laskaris dynasty, which had ruled the Byzantine Empire in Nicaea from 1204 to 1261. Lavarello worked on and extended his genealogy throughout his life. In 1973, a version of his genealogy made him out to be a descendant of the Greek god Zeus. Up until her death in 1976, Lavarello's mother Olga Cassanello was his close confidant and supported his claims, including the lie that she was descended from a Turkish Khan and that she was the illegitimate daughter of Amadeo I of Spain, the brother of Umberto I of Italy. Among the gay men of Italy in the mid-20th-century, Lavarello was not alone in claiming monarchical connections. This practice may have been an attempt to claim the exclusive and exotic dignity of the nobility, through ennobling themselves and thus "inverting" their marginalization. Lavarello pursued the opportunities he could in order to make himself more known. In 1946, he challenged a similar eccentric pretender, Vittorio San Martin, who claimed to be the rightful king of Italy, to a duel.

Claimant emperor 

On 10 September 1948, Lavarello was recognized as a descendant of the Byzantine emperors, and as the rightful Grand Master of the Constantinian Order of Saint George, by a Roman court. Lavarello was not the only Byzantine pretender recognized in this way. The legal system of Italy in the 1950s and 1960s provided ample ground for imposters and claimants such as Lavarello, and many such as himself managed to secure limited legal recognition. Typically, the courts did not investigate the claims in any detail, and they lacked the competence and authority to official proclaim someone as a Byzantine heir.

The style Lavarello was recognized under in 1948 was "Imperiale il principe Don Marziano II Lascaris Comneno Flavio Angelo Lavarello Ventimiglia di Turgoville". He later often went under simply "Marziano II Lavarello Lascaris Paleologo" or "Marziano II Lavarello Obrenovic", though the specific names used varied from time to time. One version of Lavarello's full claimed titles read "Titular Emperor of Constantinople, Despot of Nicaea and Bithynia, Grand Duke, Sebastokrator and Byzantine Patrician, Emperor of Trebizond, Sovereign of Cephalonia and Asia Minor, Porphyrogenitus, Imperial and Royal Prince Lascaris-Doukas, Grand Head of the House of Lascaris, the Ninth Dynasty of the Holy Roman Empire of the East".
In the 1950s, Lavarello famously engaged in a long legal feud with the Neapolitan comedian and actor Totò, who also began to claim Byzantine descent and various titles as a supposed descendant of the Komnenos dynasty (emperors 1081–1185), mostly to mock the meaninglessness of claiming such long-defunct titles. Both Lavarello and Totò held court and distributed supposed Byzantine noble titles among their friends and supporters. The feud began in 1952, when Totò's heraldic consultant, Luciano Pelliccioni Di Poli, a former friend of Lavarello, issued a complaint concerning Lavarelllo to a Roman court, claiming that Lavarello had falsified his baptismal certificate. In return, Lavarello accused Totò of having gained his legal recognition through presenting falsified documents concerning his descent. Totò then accused Lavarello of slander. According to Totò, he pursued legal action against Lavarello not because he cared about his imperial claims, but instead because of Lavarello's accusations against him. Though Lavarello maintained his claims until his death, his legal battles with Totò were not very successful. On 25 January 1953, Lavarello was sentenced to one year and six months in prison for slander and defamation.Though Lavarello did not have to serve his prison sentence, on account of Totò's generosity, he was forbidden from using the Byzantine surname Lascaris improperly in the future. Despite this, on 18 November 1956, Lavarello and his mother held a "coronation ceremony" in a Methodist church in Rome and he would later annually celebrate the anniversary of this ceremony. The bishop responsible who placed the crown on Lavarello's head, Jean Marie van Assendelft Atland, was not a real priest. Outraged by the farce, Pope Pius XII threatened those present with excommunication, though nothing eventually came of the these threats. The altar boy present at the ceremony, Jean-François Heuterbize, eventually became a real Eastern Orthodox bishop in Athens. The crown, orb, scepter and costumes used in the ceremony apparently came from the warehouses of the local opera house. On 18 November 1960, Lavarello issued a series of coins to commemorate his coronation. The inscriptions of these coins style him as "Marcianus II Serviae Rex Romanorum Imperator Dei Sacratus Gratia".

Other issues and later years 

Lavarello also faced other legal issues. In 1961, Lavarello was accused of "obscene acts in a public place" because of a sexual encounter with a young man on the stairs outside his building on Via Piemonte in Rome. Lavarello was at one point publicly accused of pederasty by Pelliccioni in the Italian press. Though Lavarello sued Pelliccioni for defamation, Pelliccioni was acquitted after simply pointing out that Lavarello had showed up to the hearing wearing a wig and women's stockings, and with painted nails and fake eyelashes. Lavarello's feud with Pelliccioni outlasted his feud with Totò. At one point, after Lavarello had published an article claiming that Pelliccioni had served prison time due to armed robbery, Lavarello encountered Pelliccioni outside a café in Rome. Pelliccioni slapped Lavarello, and a fight broke out between them. Though the police eventually intervened, Pelliccioni managed to tear off Lavarello's wig and shouted that he would "return it to the Turkish embassy", since Constantinople was now Istanbul in Turkey. Lavarello again sued Pelliccioni, but he was once again acquitted. Any time Lavarello attempted to stand up against his detractors, he thus only suffered further ridicule. One of Lavarello's most prominent critics, Dino Salvatore, wrote in 1964 concerning Lavarello that "in certain circles he is better known as Hairpiece I, since, instead of an undue imperial crown, he constantly wears a wavy blonde wig on his head".

Despite Lavarello's claim to represent the head of the Orthodox Church and to outrank the pope, he and his closest supporters were devoted to the occult and held séances at his residence. These meetings eventually attracted actual Italian and foreign nobility, including, notably, Farouk I, the exiled king of Egypt. It is possible that real Italian nobles were attracted to Lavarello's side through nostalgia for the relatively recently abolished Italian monarchy.

In his final years, Lavarello had grown poor due to his many legal battles and moved to a small apartment on Via Sicilia 14 in Rome. Lavarello continued to hold meetings with his supporters, and would play his "Byzantine national anthem", originally composed for his 1956 coronation, from his telephone answering machine. At some point he was attacked, tied up, beaten and robbed of some of his few remaining assets. The walls of his flat were covered in signed pictures of royalty, though the pictures had all been cut out of magazines and they had all been signed by Lavarello himself. Lavarello died on 7 October 1992. His funeral was held at the Church of St. Nicholas on Via Palestro 69 in Rome, a Russian Orthodox Church, which still houses one of Lavarello's manufactured "imperial crowns". How Lavarello managed to secure such a funeral for himself is not clear.

Claims of succession 
Despite having concerns throughout his life that he had no children to pass his claims onto, Lavarello died childless. In the 1970s, Lavarello had caused a scandal when he sent out invitations to a wedding between himself and a young man. It is not clear whether the ceremony was actually intended to be a wedding ceremony or if it was in reality supposed to be an adoption ceremony, wherein Lavarello was to designate the man to be his heir. Several newspapers reported on Lavarello's invitations with dismay and no ceremony appears to have actually taken place.

The current pretender Arcadia Luigi Maria Picco, born in 1958 in Iglesias, Sardinia, claims to be Lavarello's successor, alleging that Lavarello willed his titles to him in the absence of heirs of his own. Picco thus claims the title of "Roman Byzantine Emperor" and claims to be the head of the house of "Lavarello Obrenović Angelo Flavio". Picco's claims are questionable given the lack of family relationship between him and Lavarello and the lack of evidence of the authenticity of the relevant documents. The documents, supposedly written and signed by Lavarello, conferring Picco the inheritance are dated to 13, 25 and 29 October 1992, several days after Lavarello's death.

See also 

 Succession to the Byzantine Empire

Notes

References

External links 
 L'ultimo dei Lascaris: Marziano II di Bisanzio – 1949 video clip of Lavarello performing a knighting ritual

1921 births
1992 deaths
Impostor pretenders
Byzantine pretenders after 1453
Italian LGBT people
People from Genoa
Pretenders to the Serbian throne
20th-century Italian people